Fayçal Fajr (born 1 August 1988) is a professional footballer who plays as an attacking midfielder for Saudi Professional League club Al Wehda. Born in France, he plays for the Morocco national team.

Career

Early career
Fajr was born in the city of Rouen and began his career with local amateur club Sottevillais Cheminots. In 2000, he joined the youth academy of professional club Le Havre. After three years, Fajr was released after being told he lacked the physical requirements to remain. He, subsequently, returned home to join hometown club Rouen. Fajr spent two years at the club and, in 2005, signed a contract with CMS Oissel. With Oissel, he played in the Championnat de France amateur 2, the fifth division of French football.

After two seasons playing on the senior team of Oissel, in 2008, Fajr moved up one division to sign with Étoile Fréjus Saint-Raphaël, then known as ES Fréjus. In his first season with the club, he appeared in 29 matches scoring four goals. Fréjus finished second in its group, however, due to the Direction Nationale du Contrôle de Gestion (National Directorate of Management Control) (DNCG) imposing sanctions on several clubs in the Championnat National, the club was given a spot in the third division. After playing mainly as a substitute in his inaugural season with the club, Fajr became a starter in the club's first season in National. He appeared in 29 league matches as Fréjus finished mid-table. In his final season with the club, Fajr became the club's primary play-maker. He posted career-highs in appearances (34) and goals (8). Fréjus finished the campaign in sixth place.

Caen

After a successful campaign with Fréjus, Fajr was linked to several professional clubs, most notably Nice, Dijon, Lens, and Reims. On 18 July 2011, it was confirmed that he would be joining Ligue 1 club Caen on a three-year contract. The transfer was completed the following day. Fajr was assigned the number 29 shirt and simultaneously made his professional and club debut on 28 August in a league match against Rennes. Three days later, in a Coupe de la Ligue match against Brest, he scored his first goal for Caen in a 3–2 victory. Caen were relegated to the Ligue 2 in his first season, but he helped them back up two seasons later. In the 2013–14 season, he scored 8 league goals in 35 games and Caen were promoted to the top-flight Ligue 1.

Spain
On 24 June 2014, Fajr passed his medical and completed the move to the La Liga side Elche. He made his debut in the category on 24 August, coming on as a substitute for Ferrán Corominas in a 0–3 away loss against FC Barcelona.

On 6 August 2015 Fajr was loaned to fellow league team Deportivo de La Coruña, for one year. Ahead of the 2016–17 campaign, he signed a permanent contract with the club.

On 20 July 2017, Fajr signed a two-year deal with Getafe CF, still in the first division.

Later career
On 3 August 2018, Fajr returned to his former club Caen. A year later, he went back to Getafe.

On 14 September 2020, Fajr signed a two-year deal with Turkish Süper Lig side Sivasspor.

On 19 June 2022, Fajr joined Saudi Arabian club Al-Wehda.

International career
Born and raised in France, Fajr made his senior debut for the Morocco national football team in a 2018 World Cup qualifying game against Equatorial Guinea in a 1–0 loss.

In May 2018 he was named in Morocco's 23-man squad for the 2018 FIFA World Cup in Russia. Morocco's national football team played against Iran, Portugal, and Spain in the group stage. During Morocco's match against Spain, Fajr made the corner kick that led to Youssef En-Nesyri's goal with nine minutes remaining.

Career statistics

Club

International

Scores and results list Morocco's goal tally first.

Honours
Sivasspor
 Turkish Cup: 2021–22

References

External links

Living people
1988 births
Footballers from Rouen
Citizens of Morocco through descent
Moroccan footballers
Morocco international footballers
French footballers
French sportspeople of Moroccan descent
Association football midfielders
Ligue 1 players
Ligue 2 players
Championnat National players
La Liga players
Süper Lig players
Saudi Professional League players
CMS Oissel players
ÉFC Fréjus Saint-Raphaël players
Stade Malherbe Caen players
Elche CF players
Deportivo de La Coruña players
Getafe CF footballers
Sivasspor footballers
Al-Wehda Club (Mecca) players
French expatriate footballers
Moroccan expatriate footballers
Expatriate footballers in Saudi Arabia
Expatriate footballers in Spain
Expatriate footballers in Turkey
French expatriate sportspeople in Saudi Arabia
French expatriate sportspeople in Spain
French expatriate sportspeople in Turkey
Moroccan expatriate sportspeople in Saudi Arabia
Moroccan expatriate sportspeople in Spain
Moroccan expatriate sportspeople in Turkey
2017 Africa Cup of Nations players
2018 FIFA World Cup players
2019 Africa Cup of Nations players
2021 Africa Cup of Nations players